This is the old Swedish name day calendar, sanctioned by the Swedish Academy in 1901, with official status until 1972. Some days still refer to traditional or religious feasts rather than personal names. Some of the names below are linked to the original saints or martyrs from which they originate. A work group, consisting of the Swedish Academy, publishers and others, agreed to adopt a new name day list in 2001, very similar to the old one but with more names. It is intended that this list will be updated every 15 years. In the year of 2022 seven new names will be added .

In Sweden, it is not uncommon for people to celebrate their name day.

The tradition originated with the Calendar of Saints.

January
Nyårsdagen (no name)
Svea
Alfred
Rut
Hanna
Trettondedag jul (no name)
August
Erland
Gunnar
Sigurd
Jan
Frideborg
Knut
Felix
Laura
Hjalmar
Anton
Hilda
Henrik
Fabian
Agnes
Vincent
Emelie
Erika
Paulus
Botilda
Göte
Karl (*)
Valter
Gunilla
Ivar

February
Max
Kyndelsmässodagen (no name)
Disa
Ansgar
Agata
Dorotea
Rikard
Berta
Fanny
Eugenia
Yngve
Evelina
Agne
Valentin
Sigfrid
Julia
Alexandra
Frida
Gabriella
Hulda
Hilding
Martina
Torsten
Mattias
Sigvard
Torgny
Lage
Maria , Maja
(only in Leap Years)

March
Ernst
Gunborg
Adrian
Tora
Ebba
Camilla
Filippa
Torbjörn
Ethel
Edvin
Viktoria (*) Regina
Greger
Matilda
Kristoffer
Herbert
Gertrud
Edvard
Josef
Joakim
Bengt
Viktor
Gerda
Gabriel
Marie bebådelsedag (no name)
Emanuel
Rudolf
Malkolm
Jonas

Holger
Ester, Noa

April
Harald
Gudmund
Ferdinand
Ambrosius
Nanna
Vilhelm
Ingemund
Hemming
Otto
Ingvar
Ulf
Julius
Artur
Tiburtius
Olivia
Patrik
Elias
Valdemar
Olaus Petri
Amalia
Anselm
Albertina
Georg
Vega
Markus
Teresia
Engelbrekt
Ture
 Tove
Mariana

May
Valborg
Filip
Göta
Monika
Gotthard
Sigmund
Gustava
Åke
Bille
Esbjörn
Märta
Carlos
Linnea
Halvard
Sofia
Hilma
Rebecka
Erik
Alrik
Karolina
Konstantin
Henning
Desideria
Ragnvald
Urban
Vilhelmina
Blenda
Ingeborg
Baltsar
Fritjof
Isabella

June
Gun, Gunnel
Rutger
Ingemar
Holmfrid
Bo
Gustav
Robert
Salomon
Börje
Svante
Bertil
Eskil
Aina
Håkan
Justina
Axel
Torborg
Björn
Germund
Flora
Alf
Paulina
Adolf
Johannes Döparens dag
David
Rakel
Selma
Leo
Petrus
Elof

July
Aron
Rosa
Aurora
Ulrika
Melker
Esaias
Klas
Kjell
Götilda
Anund
Eleonora
Herman
Joel
Folke
Ragnhild
Reinhold
Alexis
Fredrik
Sara
Margareta
Johanna
Magdalena
Emma
Kristina
Jakob
Jesper
Marta
Botvid
Olof, Olle
Algot
Helena, Elin

August
Per
Karin
Tage
Arne
Ulrik
Sixten
Dennis
Sylvia (*)
Roland
Lars
Susanna
Klara
Hillevi
Ebbe
Stella
Brynolf
Verner
Helena
Magnus
Bernhard
Josefina
Henrietta
Signe
Bartolomeus
Lovisa
Östen
Rolf
Fatima,Leila
Hans
Albert
Arvid

September
Samuel
Justus
Alfhild, Alva
Moses
Adela
Sakarias
Regina
Alma
Augusta
Tord
Dagny
Tyra
Ambjörn
Ida
Sigrid, Siri
Eufemia
Hildegard
Alvar
Fredrika
Lisa
Matteus
Maurits
Tekla
Gerhard
Signild
Einar
Dagmar
Lennart
Mikael
Helge

October
Ragnar
Love, Ludvig
Evald
Frans
Bror
Jenny, Jennifer
Birgitta
Nils
Ingrid
Helmer
Erling
Valfrid
Teofil
Manfred
Hedvig
Finn
Antoinetta
Lukas
Tore
Sibylla (changed from Kasper in 1934)
Birger
Seved
Sören
Evert
Inga
Amanda
Sabina
Simon
Viola
Elsa
Edit

November
Allhelgonadagen
Tobias, Tim 
Hubert
Sverker (changed from Nore in 1905)
Eugen
Gustav Adolf
Ingegerd
Vendela
Teodor
Martin Luther
Mårten
Konrad
Christian 
Emil
Leopold
Edmund
Napoleon
Magnhild
Elisabet
Pontus
Helga
Cecilia
Klemens
Gudrun
Katarina
Torkel
Astrid (changed from Estrid in 1907)
Malte
Sune
Anders

December
Oskar
Beata
Lydia, Cornelia
Barbro
Sven
Nikolaus
Agaton
Virginia
Anna
Malin
Daniel
Alexander
Lucia
Sten
Gottfrid
Assar
Inge
Abraham
Isak
Israel
Tomas
Natalie
Adam
Eva
Juldagen (no name)
Stefan—Staffan
Johannes
Menlösa barns dag (no name)
Abel
Set
Sylvester

Notes

External links
 Name days - Svenska akademien 

Festivals in Sweden
Sweden
Swedish culture
Swedish given names
Sweden